Chikwenye Okonjo Ogunyemi (born 1939) is a Nigerian academic, a literary critic and writer. She taught at Sarah Lawrence College and she is best known for her articles and books concerning the theory of Womanism and the African Diaspora. She attended Queen's School Ede where she wrote and passed her final exams in 1957.

Career 
Ogunyemi published Africa Wo/man Palava: The Nigerian novel by women in 1996. The book examined the work of eight Nigerian women writers, namely Zaynab Alkali, Simi Bedford, Buchi Emecheta, Funmilayo Fakunle, Flora Nwapa, Eno Obong, Ifeoma Okoye, and Adaora Lily Ulasi. Ogunyemi set out a new theory of Nigerian literature based on their works. This theory was womanist and feminist, but Ogunyemi also noted that naming is a political issue and by labelling a theory she was not pigeon-holing the writers. Alongside other critics such as Helen Chukwuma and Omolara Ogundipe-Leslie, Ogunyemi explored postcolonial ideas and argued against the work of "phallic critics".

Ogunyemi was professor of literature and also chair of global studies at Sarah Lawrence College in Yonkers, New York. In collaboration with Tuzyline Jita Allan, Ogunyemi edited an anthology of essays called Twelve Best Books by African Women: Critical Readings which was published in 2009.

Selected works

References

Further reading 

Living people
1939 births
Nigerian women educators
Womanist writers
Nigerian women academics
Nigerian-American culture and history
Sarah Lawrence College faculty
Date of birth missing (living people)
Place of birth missing (living people)